The 2016 AFC U-23 Championship qualification was a men's under-23 football competition which decided the participating teams of the 2016 AFC U-23 Championship. Players born on or after 1 January 1993 were eligible to compete in the tournament.

A total of 16 teams qualified to play in the final tournament, including Qatar who qualified automatically as hosts.

The top three teams of the final tournament qualified for the 2016 Summer Olympics men's football tournament in Brazil.

Draw
The draw for the qualifiers was held on 4 December 2014, 11:00 UTC+8, at the AFC House in Kuala Lumpur, Malaysia. A total of 43 AFC member national teams entered the qualifying stage and were drawn into ten groups.
West Zone had 23 entrants from Central Asia, South Asia and West Asia (excluding hosts Qatar who did not enter the qualifying stage), where they were drawn into three groups of five teams and two groups of four teams
East Zone had 20 entrants from ASEAN and East Asia, where they were drawn into five groups of four teams.

The teams were seeded according to their performance in the previous season in 2013.

Notes
1 Non-IOC member, ineligible for Olympics.

Format
In each group, teams played each other once at a centralised venue. The ten group winners and the best five runners-up from all groups qualified for the final tournament.

Tiebreakers
The teams were ranked according to points (3 points for a win, 1 point for a draw, 0 points for a loss). If tied on points, tiebreakers would be applied in the following order:
Greater number of points obtained in the group matches between the teams concerned;
Goal difference resulting from the group matches between the teams concerned;
Greater number of goals scored in the group matches between the teams concerned;
If, after applying criteria 1 to 3, teams still have an equal ranking, criteria 1 to 3 are reapplied exclusively to the matches between the teams in question to determine their final rankings. If this procedure does not lead to a decision, criteria 5 to 9 apply;
Goal difference in all the group matches;
Greater number of goals scored in all the group matches;
Penalty shoot-out if only two teams are involved and they are both on the field of play;
Fewer score calculated according to the number of yellow and red cards received in the group matches (1 point for a single yellow card, 3 points for a red card as a consequence of two yellow cards, 3 points for a direct red card, 4 points for a yellow card followed by a direct red card);
Drawing of lots.

Group stage
The matches were played between 23 and 31 March 2015 for Groups A and C (five-team groups); 27–31 March 2015 for Groups D–J (four-team groups); 16–20 May 2015 for Group B (due to postponement).

Group A
All matches were held in Oman.
Times listed were UTC+4.

Group B
All matches were originally scheduled to be held in Pakistan, between 23 and 31 March 2015 at Punjab Stadium, Lahore, but were postponed due to safety and security reasons after bombings and civil unrest in the city.
All matches were later scheduled to be held in the United Arab Emirates between 16 and 24 May 2015. After the withdrawal of Turkmenistan, the dates were shortened to 16–20 May 2015.
Times listed were UTC+4.

Group C
All matches were held in Iran.
Times listed were UTC+4:30.

Group D
All matches were held in United Arab Emirates.
Times listed were UTC+4.

Group E
All matches were held in Bangladesh.
Times listed were UTC+6.

Group F
All matches were held in Taiwan.
Times listed were UTC+8.

Group G
All matches were held in Thailand.
Times listed were UTC+7.

Group H
All matches were held in Indonesia.
Times listed were UTC+7.

Group I
All matches were held in Malaysia.
Times listed were UTC+8.

Group J
All matches were held in Laos.
Times listed were UTC+7.

Ranking of second-placed teams
In order to ensure equality when comparing the runner-up team of all groups, the results of the matches against the 5th-placed team in Groups A and C were ignored due to the other groups having only four teams.

The best runner-up teams among those ranked second in the groups were determined as follows:
Greater number of points obtained from group matches identified by AFC;
Goal difference resulting from group matches identified by AFC;
Greater number of goals scored in group matches identified by AFC;
Greater number of wins in group matches identified by AFC;
Fewer score calculated according to the number of yellow and red cards received in group matches identified by AFC (1 point for a single yellow card, 3 points for a red card as a consequence of two yellow cards, 3 points for a direct red card, 4 points for a yellow card followed by a direct red card);
Drawing of lots.

Qualified teams
The following 16 teams qualified for the final tournament.

2 Bold indicates champion for that year. Italic indicates host for that year.

Goalscorers
6 goals

 Omar Khribin

5 goals

 Jamie Maclaren

4 goals

 Sardar Azmoun
 Mahdi Kamel
 Amjad Waleed
 Baha' Faisal
 Faisal Al-Azemi
 Saud Al-Farsi
 Nguyễn Công Phượng

3 goals

 Andrew Hoole
 Amir Arsalan Motahari
 Mahmoud Al-Mardi
 Hatem Al-Hamhami
 Mahmoud Maowas
 Lê Thanh Bình

2 goals

 Connor Pain
 Komail Al-Aswad
 Chan Vathanaka
 Chen Hao
 Feng Gang
 Wu Xinghan
 Xie Pengfei
 Xu Xin
 Muchlis Hadi Ning Syaifulloh
 Ayman Hussein
 Bashar Rasan
 Shoya Nakajima
 Gakuto Notsuda
 Laith Al-Bashtawi
 Saleh Rateb
 Jeong Seung-hyun
 Kim Seung-jun
 Moon Chang-jin
 Sitthideth Khanthavong
 Alexis Khazzaka
 Hlaing Bo Bo
 Zon Moe Aung
 Mohammed Maraaba
 Fadi Zidan
 Ahmed Al-Nathiri
 Irfan Fandi
 Pinyo Inpinit
 Chenrop Samphaodi
 Ahmed Rabia Gheilani
 Yousif Saeed
 Abbosbek Makhsatalliev
 Sardor Rakhmanov
 Yaser Ali Al-Gabr
 Ayman Al-Hagri

1 goal

 Sayed Mohammad Hashimi
 Khalid Ahmad Sharif
 Mustafa Amini
 Joshua Brillante
 Brad Smith
 Jaushua Sotirio
 Adam Taggart
 Abdullah Al-Ajmi
 Ali Madan
 Sary Matnorotin
 Prak Mony Udom
 Soeuy Visal
 Guo Hao
 Li Yuanyi
 Zang Yifeng
 Ko Yu-ting
 Wei Yu-jen
 Wen Chih-hao
 Leung Ka Hai
 Leung Nok Hang
 Evan Dimas
 Manahati Lestusen
 Ahmad Noviandani
 Adam Alis Setyano
 Hansamu Yama
 Behnam Barzay
 Roozbeh Cheshmi
 Alireza Jahanbakhsh
 Milad Kamandani
 Ali Karimi
 Mohammad Hossein Moradmand
 Shahin Saghebi
 Ali Hisni
 Abdul-Qadir Tariq
 Wataru Endo
 Yuya Kubo
 Takumi Minamino
 Musashi Suzuki
 Yuta Toyokawa
 Feras Shelbaieh
 Ho Myong-chol
 Jang Kuk-chol
 Jang Ok-chol
 Jo Kwang
 Kim Ju-song
 Pak Hyon-il
 Ri Hyong-jin
 So Kyong-jin
 Jang Hyun-soo
 Kim Hyun
 Kwon Chang-hoon
 Lee Chan-dong
 Lee Chang-min
 Lee Yong-jae
 Mohammad Al-Nassar
 Avazbek Otkeev
 Tiny Bounmalay
 Armisay Kettavong
 Phoutthasay Khochalern
 Soukchinda Natphasouk
 Khonesavanh Sihavong
 Mahmoud Siblini
 Nazirul Naim Che Hashim
 Syahrul Azwari Ibrahim
 Wan Ahmad Amirzafran Wan Nadris
 Mohamed Irufaan
 Hamza Mohamed
 Purevdorj Erdenebat
 Mungunshagai Tsogtbaatar
 Ishad Obaid Al-Abdul Salam
 Omar Al-Fazari
 Anwar Al-Hinai
 Omar Al-Malki
 Ahmed Al-Siyabi
 Kaung Sat Naing
 Nay Lin Tun
 Saddam Hussain
 Mansoor Khan
 Mahmoud Abu Warda
 Mahmoud Shaikh Qasem
 Fitch Arboleda
 Paolo Salenga
 Mustafa Al-Bassas
 Abdulrahman Al-Ghamdi
 Ryan Al-Mousa
 Mohammed Al-Saiari
 Saleh Al-Shehri
 Abdulfattah Asiri
 Abdullah Madu
 Mahmood Al-Baher
 Zohar Mohamed Zarwan
 Jahongir Aliev
 Jahongir Ergashev
 Romish Jalilov
 Firuz Rakhmatov
 Navruz Rustamov
 Parvizdzhon Umarbaev
 Pakorn Prempak
 Kasidech Wettayawong
 Chaowat Veerachat
 Agostinho
 Ezequiel
 Henrique Cruz
 Ahmed Barman
 Khalfan Mubarak
 Saif Rashid
 Vladimir Kozak
 Jaloliddin Masharipov
 Igor Sergeev
 Hồ Ngọc Thắng
 Võ Huy Toàn
 Waleed Al-Hubaishi
 Mohammed Al-Sarori
 Ala Addin Mahdi

1 own goal

 Manas Karipov (playing against Pakistan)
 Tang Hou Fai (playing against Japan)
 Nadir Mabrook (playing against Iraq)
 Saeed Awadh Al-Yami (playing against Iran)
 Sunil Roshan (playing against United Arab Emirates)

References

External links
 , The-AFC.com

 
Qualification
2016
U-23 Championship qualification

AFC